Linzë is a village in the former municipality of Dajt in Tirana County, Albania. At the 2015 local government reform it became part of the municipality Tirana.

Demographic history 
the village of Linzë (Lunza) appears in the Ottoman defter of 1467 as a part of the timar of Bahadır in the nahiyah of Benda. The settlement had a total of eight households which were represented by: Pelgrin, Uksiçi son of Pelgrini, Gjoni son of Pali, Gjergj Bisari, Kola Bisari, Engjëll Bisari, Gjon Bisari, and Gjon Martolosi.

References

Populated places in Tirana
Villages in Tirana County